

This is a list of the National Register of Historic Places listings in Isle of Wight County, Virginia.

This is intended to be a complete list of the properties and districts on the National Register of Historic Places in Isle of Wight County, Virginia, United States.  The locations of National Register properties and districts for which the latitude and longitude coordinates are included below, may be seen in a Google map.

There are 21 properties and districts listed on the National Register in the county, including 1 National Historic Landmark.  Another property was once listed, but has since been removed.

Current listings

|}

Former listing

|}

See also

 List of National Historic Landmarks in Virginia
 National Register of Historic Places listings in Virginia
 National Register of Historic Places listings in Franklin, Virginia

References

 
Isle of Wight